Kundanahalli may refer to:

Geography
 Kundanahalli, Mysuru, a village in Piriyapatna Taluk in Mysore district of Karnataka state, India
 Kundanahalli, Mandya, a village in Krishnarajpet Taluk in Mandya district of Karnataka state, India
 Kundalahalli, Bangalore, a neighborhood in Bangalore of Karnataka state, India sometimes wrongly referred as Kundanahalli